A list of books and essays about Pier Paolo Pasolini:

*

Pasolini, Pier Paolo
Pier Paolo Pasolini